is a Japanese television series starring Ken Utsui, Momoe Yamaguchi, Yūsaku Matsuda, and Ryoko Nakano. It was broadcast from 1974 to 1975 on the TBS channel. It was the first of the "Akai" series of television dramas.

Plot

Criminal psychologist Masato Yuki, played by Ken Utsui, returns from a three-year sojourn in America, to his wife and daughter Akiko, played by Momoe Yamaguchi. Shortly after his return, his wife is murdered under suspicious circumstances.

Theme music

The opening theme music was written by Fausto Cigliano.

Japanese drama television series
1974 Japanese television series debuts
1975 Japanese television series endings
TBS Television (Japan) dramas
Television shows written by James Miki